Laura Gladys Smithwick (May 28, 1898 – December 28, 1964) was an American physician. She served as a Presbyterian medical missionary in China and the Belgian Congo.

Early life 
Smithwick was born in Warren County, North Carolina, one of the eight children of James Walter Smithwick and Laura S. Fort Smithwick. She completed a bachelor's degree at Oxford College in North Carolina in 1919. She earned a medical degree the Medical College of Virginia in 1925, where she was a member of the Alpha Epsilon Iota professional society. She later earned a master's degree in public health at Tulane University, and studied anesthesiology at Massachusetts Memorial Hospital in Boston.

Career 
After medical school, Smithwick worked at the Catawba Sanatorium in Virginia, and the Rhode Island State Sanatorium. She spent much of her career as a medical missionary with the American Southern Presbyterian Mission. She was posted in China from 1929 to 1935, where she was co-director of a women's hospital at Suzhou. She was an anesthesiologist and an active clubwoman in Lexington, Kentucky, in the 1930s and 1940s.

Smithwick hoped to return to China after World War II; instead, she studied French in Belgium, and worked at a leprosarium in the Kasai Province of the Belgian Congo, from 1949 to 1963.

On furloughs in the United States, she spoke about her work at Presbyterian churches.

Personal life 
Smithwick died in 1964, aged 66 years, at a hospital in Charlotte, North Carolina. There is a file of her letters in the Presbyterian Historical Society archives.

References 

1898 births
1964 deaths
People from Warren County, North Carolina
20th-century American women physicians
20th-century American physicians
Medical missionaries
Medical College of Virginia alumni
Tulane University alumni
Presbyterian missionaries in Asia
Presbyterian missionaries in Africa
20th-century American people